
The Indian General Service Medal (1909 IGSM) was a campaign medal approved on 1 January 1909, for issue to officers and men of the British and Indian armies. From 1919, it was also awarded to officers and men of the Royal Air Force, with the Waziristan 1925 clasp awarded solely to the RAF.

Clasps
The 1909 IGSM was awarded for various minor military campaigns in India from 1908 to 1935.  Each campaign was represented by a clasp on the ribbon; 12 were sanctioned.

North West Frontier 1908 
Abor 1911–12 
Afghanistan NWF 1919
Mahsud 1919–20
Waziristan 1919–21
Malabar 1921–22
Waziristan 1921–24
Waziristan 1925
North West Frontier 1930–31
Burma 1930–32
Mohmand 1933
North West Frontier 1935

Description
It was struck at both the Calcutta and London mints, for Indian and British forces respectively. For early campaigns it was awarded in silver to combatants and in bronze to native bearers and servants. From 1919 onwards all awards were in silver.

The obverse shows the reigning monarch facing left with a suitable inscription. There are three versions:

The reverse depicts Jamrud Fort at the Khyber Pass with the word ‘India’ below between a wreath of oak and olive branches.

From 1920, those mentioned in despatches in a campaign for which the medal was awarded could wear a bronze oakleaf on the medal ribbon.

The name and details of the recipient were engraved or impressed on the edge of the medal.

Waziristan 1925
The Medal with the Waziristan 1925 clasp was awarded to only 46 officers and 214 men of the Royal Air Force, and 2 Indian Army Officers, who took part in Pink's War.  It is, by far, the rarest clasp given with an India General Service Medal, with the exception of only 14 ‘Burma 1930-32’ clasps, awarded to the Royal Air Force, and was only awarded after the then Chief of the Air Staff, Sir John Salmond, succeeded in overturning the War Office decision not to grant a medal for Pink's War. The ‘Waziristan 1925’ clasp, was not awarded to Royal Air Force personnel, who already had, or elected to have, the ‘Waziristan 1921-24’ clasp. For details, see ‘British Battles & Medals’, 7th. Edition.

See also
North-West Frontier (military history)

Notes

Bibliography
 
 
 Laffin, John, Swifter than Eagles, a biography of Marshal of the RAF Sir John Salmond, (1964). William Blackwood & Sons Ltd
 Mackay, J and Mussel, J (eds), Medals Yearbook - 2006, (2005). Token Publishing
 Mussell, John W. (ed), Medals Yearbook - 2015. Token Publishing

British campaign medals
1909 establishments in India